Basilio Rosell (March 14, 1902 – November 15, 1994), nicknamed "Brujo", was a Cuban pitcher in the Negro leagues during the 1920s.

A native of Los Arabos, Cuba, Rosell made his Negro leagues debut in 1926 for the Cuban Stars (West). He went on to play many seasons in the Mexican League, and was inducted into the Mexican Professional Baseball Hall of Fame in 1979. Rosell died in 1994 at age 92.

References

External links
 and Baseball-Reference Black Baseball stats and Seamheads

1902 births
1994 deaths
Cuban Stars (East) players
Cuban Stars (West) players
Cuban baseball players
Baseball pitchers
People from Matanzas Province
Agrario de México players
Indios de Anahuac players
Algodoneros de Unión Laguna players
Diablos Rojos del México players
Mexican Baseball Hall of Fame inductees
Cuban expatriate baseball players in Mexico